Time Warner Cable, Inc. (TWC) was an American cable television company. Before it was acquired by Charter Communications on May 18, 2016, it was ranked the second largest cable company in the United States by revenue behind only Comcast, operating in 29 states.  Its corporate headquarters were located in the Time Warner Center in Midtown Manhattan, New York City, with other corporate offices in Stamford, Connecticut; Charlotte, North Carolina; and Herndon, Virginia.

It was controlled by Warner Communications, then by Time Warner (later known as WarnerMedia and presently Warner Bros. Discovery). The company had spun off its cable operations in March 2009 as part of a larger restructuring. From 2009 to 2016, Time Warner Cable was an entirely independent company, continuing to use the Time Warner name under license from its former parent company (including the "Road Runner" name for its Internet service, that was merged into what is now Spectrum Internet).

In 2014, the company was the subject of a proposed purchase by Comcast Corporation, valued at $45.2 billion; however, following opposition to the deal by various groups, along with plans by the U.S. government to try to block the merger, Comcast called off the deal in April 2015. On May 26, 2015, Charter Communications announced that it would acquire Time Warner Cable for $78.7 billion, along with Bright House Networks in a separate $10.1 billion deal, pending regulatory approval.

The purchase was completed on May 18, 2016; Charter had continued to do business as Time Warner Cable in its former markets, but has now re-branded these operations under the Spectrum brand in most markets (a brand of Charter which launched in 2014), though it will continue to use the roadrunner.com email addresses and adelphia.net email addresses to new customers.

History

Background 
Time Warner Cable traces back to two cable entities owned by Time Inc. & Warner Communications respectively in the 1970s; American Television and Communications, which was established in 1968, and would be acquired by Time in 1973; and Warner Cable, established in 1973.

Warner Cable would eventually diversify into channels with the formation of Warner Cable Communications in 1977, creating test channels such as Pinwheel, Star Channel, and even Slight on Sound; these would eventually be officially launched as Nickelodeon & The Movie Channel in 1979, and MTV in 1981 respectively. In 1979, American Express was brought in to form a joint-venture cable network and cable television firm called Warner-Amex Satellite Entertainment, and eventually Warner Cable was renamed to Warner-Amex Cable. WAC would eventually create the QUBE interactive service until it was shut down in 1984.

On June 25, 1984, it was announced that the channels would be spun off into a public-traded corporation known as MTV Networks Inc.; which was eventually purchased by Viacom International a year after.

In December 1986, American Express sold its half ownership of Warner-Amex Cable back to Warner Communications; reverting the name to Warner Cable.

In the late 1980s, Warner Communications, which was in financial trouble at the time, planned to merge with Time Inc; which would lead to ATC becoming a sibling to Warner Cable.

Time Warner Cable 
In 1990, after a hostile takeover bid from Paramount Communications was rejected; Warner Communications officially merged with Time Inc. to create Time-Warner; ATC & Warner Cable would eventually become part of a new division known as Time Warner Cable Group. ATC would eventually be renamed to Time Warner Communications around the same time as well.

Time Warner Cable Group would eventually be merged with Warner Cable & Time Warner Communications into a single division of Time Warner in 1992, utilizing the Time Warner Communications name until 1995, when it was renamed to Time Warner Cable.

In 1995, the company launched the Southern Tier On-Line Community in Elmira, New York, a cable modem service later known as Road Runner High Speed Online. That year, talks began that would later result in Warner's acquisition of Paragon Cable.  Glenn Britt (1949–2014) was the CEO from 2001 until December 2013.

Time Warner retained Time Warner Cable as a subsidiary until May 26, 2010, when it was spun out as an independent company. Prior to the spin-out, Time Warner had held an 84% stake in Time Warner Cable. Non-TW shareholders received 0.083670 shares for each share already owned. This move made Time Warner Cable the largest cable operator in the United States owned solely by a single class of shareholders (without supervoting stock).

Time Warner Cable launched DVR service in the Houston area in 2004. (TWC's Houston-area cable systems are now owned by Comcast, the parent company of NBCUniversal.) When first launched, it used Scientific-Atlanta set-top boxes with DVR.

In June 2009, Time Warner Cable unveiled a concept known as "TV Everywhere"—a means of allowing multi-platform access to live and on-demand content from television channels that is tied to a user's television subscription.

Sale to Charter Communications and company closure 

It was first reported in October 2013 that Time Warner Cable was exploring a sale of the company, possibly to Charter Communications. However, on November 22, 2013, reports surfaced that Comcast expressed interest in acquiring Time Warner Cable. Both companies were said to be placing bids for the company.  Charter reiterated its interest in purchasing Time Warner Cable and increased its bid on January 14, 2014. On February 12, 2014, it was reported that Comcast had reached a deal to acquire TWC in an overall deal valued at $45.2 billion, pending regulatory approval.

The proposed merger was met with prominent opposition from various groups, showing concerns that the sheer size of the combined company would reduce competition and would give Comcast an unprecedented level of control over the 
United States' internet and television industries, increased leverage in the distribution of NBCUniversal content, hamper over-the-top services, and lead to higher prices for its services. In April 2015, it was reported that the U.S. Department of Justice was preparing to file an antitrust lawsuit against the companies in a bid to halt the merger, primarily because the merged company would have controlled 57 percent of the nation's broadband capacity.  On April 24, 2015, Comcast officially announced that it had called off the merger.

On May 25, 2015, Bloomberg News reported that Charter was "near" a deal to acquire TWC for $195 a share. Charter had been involved in the Comcast/TWC merger, as the companies planned to divest around 4 million subscribers to Charter in order to reduce the combined company's market share to an acceptable level. The next day, Charter officially announced its intent to acquire Time Warner Cable in a deal valued at $78.7 billion, and confirmed that it would also continue with its proposed, $10.1 billion acquisition of Bright House Networks. The deal was subject to regulatory approval, although due to the relatively smaller size of the companies and their media holdings, the deal was expected to face less resistance than the Comcast/TWC merger.

The acquisition was completed on May 18, 2016. In 2017, Charter stopped using the TWC and BHN branding and fully integrate the two services' subscribers into the Spectrum brand, which was originally debuted in 2014 to market Charter's services.

Residential services
As of second quarter 2009, there were 14.6 million basic cable subscribers, 8.8 million Digital cable subscribers, 8.7 million Road Runner residential subscribers, 2.5 million DVR subscribers, and 4.5 million residential Digital Phone subscribers, which makes it the fifth-largest landline phone provider in the United States.

Business services
As of 2013, Time Warner Cable's business division had the second largest business-facing enterprise by revenue (of cable providers who offer business services), with $1.7 billion in revenue as of the third quarter of 2013. Total revenue for 2012 was $1.9 billion.

Cable Internet service

Prior to Time Warner Cable merging with Charter Communications, they offered a total of 5 tiers of internet speeds, which are listed below:

 ELP (Everyday Low Price, $14.99) - Up to 2MB/s  (would have to request to get, not actively offered/advertised)
 Standard - Up to 10MB/s
 Turbo - Up to 20MB/s
 Extreme - Up to 30MB/s
 Ultra - Up to 50MB/s

Prior Time Warner Cable internet charges/fees:

Time Warner Cable charged a modem lease fee what was $10/month and offered free WiFi with their service if requested in lieu of what Spectrum does today, what is giving the modem for free and charging $5/month for WiFi service. For Time Warner Cable, customers could purchase their own modem to alleviate that charge, along with today, Spectrum allows their customers to purchase their own router to alleviate the WiFi charge.

Naming rights
Spectrum Center, formerly Time Warner Cable Arena, is located in Charlotte, North Carolina, the home of the NBA's Charlotte Hornets. In April 2008, the then-Bobcats reached a naming rights deal with Time Warner Cable, the Charlotte area's major cable television provider; the arena was named for the cable provider in exchange for the release of the team's television rights, which had been on the TWC co-owned Carolinas Sports Entertainment Television for its first season, which failed to find much cable coverage in the Charlotte market outside of Time Warner Cable systems and went dark after a year, and then News 14 Carolina which was limited to only the North Carolina side of the market, until the arena naming rights deal was made. The team moved to the new Fox Sports South sub-feed Fox Sports Carolinas and SportSouth (now Fox Sports Southeast) with the 2008-09 season, allowing coverage through both the Carolinas. Shortly after being acquired by Charter, the arena was renamed to Spectrum Center.

On March 9, 2007, Time Warner Cable, which provided service to the northeastern Wisconsin area, signed a 10-year naming rights deal for the home field of the Wisconsin Timber Rattlers, a minor league baseball team and affiliate of the Milwaukee Brewers, based in Grand Chute, a suburb of Appleton. The team and Time Warner Cable mutually agreed to end the rights deal after the 2013 season, and the venue is now known as Neuroscience Group Field at Fox Cities Stadium, named for a local neurology practice.

Acquisitions

Adelphia
On July 31, 2006, Time Warner Cable and Comcast completed a deal to purchase practically all of Adelphia's assets for $17 billion. Time Warner Cable gained 3.3 million of Adelphia's subscribers, a 29 percent increase, while Comcast gained almost 1.7 million subscribers. Adelphia stockholders received 16% of Time Warner Cable. Time Warner Cable went public effective February 13, 2007, and the company began trading on the New York Stock Exchange on March 1, 2007.

In addition to Adelphia's coverage being divided up, Time Warner Cable and Comcast also agreed to exchange some of their own subscribers in order to consolidate key regions. An example of this is the Los Angeles market, which was mostly covered by Comcast and Adelphia (and some areas of the region already served by TWC), is now under Time Warner Cable. Philadelphia had been split between Time Warner Cable and Comcast, with the majority of cable subscribers belonging to Comcast. Time Warner Cable subscribers in Philadelphia were swapped with Comcast in early 2007. Similarly, the Houston area, which was under Time Warner, was swapped to Comcast, while the Dallas–Fort Worth metroplex was changed to Time Warner Cable (RR). In the Twin Cities, Minneapolis was Time Warner Cable and Saint Paul was Comcast. That whole market is now Comcast.

NaviSite
Time Warner Cable purchased NaviSite (NAVI), a company providing cloud and hosting services, on February 1, 2011 for $230 million, roughly equating to $5.50 per share.

Insight Communications
On August 13, 2011, Time Warner Cable announced its purchase of Insight Communications for $3 billion acquiring Insight's 760,000 subscribers nationwide. The merger was completed February 29, 2012, and as of June 2013 all of Insight Communications was absorbed into Time Warner Cable.

DukeNet Communications
On October 7, 2013, Time Warner Cable announced that it has agreed to acquire DukeNet Communications LLC for $600 million. DukeNet provides data and high-capacity bandwidth services to wireless carrier, data center, government, and enterprise customers in the Southeast.

Advance/Newhouse and Time Warner Entertainment (Bright House Networks spin off)
Some of the regional cable system clusters operated by Time Warner Cable were owned by the Time Warner Entertainment – Advance/Newhouse Partnership (TWEAN). In 2002, Advance/Newhouse Communications, unhappy with some of the operating policies of Time Warner Cable in the AOL Time Warner era, forced a restructuring of the TWEAN partnership such that Advance/Newhouse would actively manage and operate a portion of the jointly owned cable systems equal to their percentage of equity. Under this arrangement, Advance/Newhouse enjoys the proceeds of their actively managed systems rather than simply a percentage of the partnership's total earnings. The majority of the affected systems were in the Indianapolis, Tampa and Orlando markets under the Bright House Networks brand.

The transactions proposed by Charter were approved, TWC and Bright House Networks have been absorbed into Charter.

Controversies

Bandwidth metering
In Beaumont, Texas, during 2008, Time Warner Cable began testing tier-based metered data plans that effectively placed customers into a pricing hierarchy based on the amount of data that they used. In 2009, Time Warner Cable announced that additional cities including Rochester, New York will become additional test sites. In particular in Rochester groups have formed to stop TWC. Several groups including Stop TWC and Stop The Cap are currently working to oppose these efforts.  On April 7, 2009, then US Congressman Eric Massa called on TWC to eliminate its broadband Internet cap. They chose to not make a deal with Cablevision, the Long Island telecommunications company, who are the owners of News 12 Long Island on July 7, 2009.

Signal intrusion and accidental transmission of pornography
On March 16, 2010, Time Warner Cable's transmission of their Kids on Demand and Kids Pre-School on Demand channels on systems in eastern North Carolina was interrupted by programming from the adult pay television channel Playboy TV for approximately two hours between 6:15 a.m. and 8:15 a.m./EDT, in which a group of nude women talked and posed in a sexually suggestive manner. This accidental display affected Time Warner Cable's digital cable subscribers in four towns in the system's eastern North Carolina cluster, while other areas displayed a black screen. A Time Warner Cable spokesperson said in a statement to Raleigh CBS affiliate WRAL, "It was a technical malfunction that caused the wrong previews to be shown on our kids' on-demand channels. Unfortunately, it hit at the worst possible time on the worst possible channels." A Time Warner Cable executive said normal monitoring procedures did not take effect because the glitch affected only a few areas.

Cable clusters

 West Coast cluster
 California – Barstow, Desert Cities, Orange County, Los Angeles, San Bernardino, San Diego
 Hawaii (operating as Oceanic Time Warner Cable)
 Midwest cluster
 Kansas – Kansas City, Overland Park, Olathe, Shawnee
 Missouri – Kansas City, Independence, Lee's Summit
 Nebraska
 Ohio – Akron, Bowling Green/North Baltimore, Canton, Cincinnati, Cleveland, Columbus, Dayton, Findlay/Lima, and Youngstown
 Kentucky – Lexington, Louisville, Northern Kentucky, Ashland
 Pennsylvania – Erie County, Sharon, Franklin
 Wisconsin – Green Bay and Milwaukee
 Northeast cluster
 Maine
 New Hampshire – Berlin, Keene
 Massachusetts – Athol, Pittsfield
 Upstate New York
 The Carolinas cluster
 North Carolina – Charlotte, Raleigh, Greensboro, and Wilmington
 South Carolina – Columbia, Sumter, Florence, Summerville, Hilton Head and Myrtle Beach.
 New York cluster
New Jersey – Bergen County, Hudson County
 New York – New York City (Manhattan, Queens, Staten Island, most of western Brooklyn); Mount Vernon (Westchester County, rest of county is served by Cablevision)
 Texas cluster 
 Texas – Arlington, Austin, Beaumont/Port Arthur, Corpus Christi, Dallas, El Paso, Fredericksburg, Harlingen, Killeen/Temple, Laredo, Rio Grande Valley, San Antonio, Waco, and Wichita Falls
 coincidentally, the Irving-Grapevine-Coppell-Lewisville cluster had been under Time Warner Cable's control upon acquisition of Paragon Cable. This was prior to AT&T Broadband's full absorption of that cluster.
 Systems not part of a cluster
 Alabama – Dothan, Enterprise
 Arizona – Yuma
 California – El Centro
 Colorado – Gunnison, Telluride
 Idaho – Coeur d’Alene, Moscow
 Indiana – Terre Haute
 Maryland – Crisfield
 Virginia – Accomac, Chincoteague, Franklin, Richlands, Virginia Beach
 Washington - Kennewick, Pullman, Yakima
 West Virginia – Clarksburg

Divisions
Time Warner Cable's divisions, from official website:

West Region

 PAC West Region
 Oceanic Time Warner Cable (Hawaii)
 Time Warner Cable Desert Cities
 Time Warner Cable San Diego
 Time Warner Cable Southern California (SoCal)
 Midwest Region
 Time Warner Cable Kansas City
 Time Warner Cable Nebraska
 Time Warner Cable Northeast Ohio & Western Pennsylvania (Akron, Canton, Cleveland & Youngstown; Erie County & Sharon, PA)
 Time Warner Cable Mid-Ohio (Columbus)
 Time Warner Cable Southwest Ohio (Dayton; Cincinnati; Lexington, KY; Louisville, KY; Terre Haute, IN; Clarksburg, WV)
 Time Warner Cable Wisconsin (Milwaukee & Green Bay)
 Texas Region
 Time Warner Cable National (non-clustered systems)

East Region

 Northeast Region
 Time Warner Cable Albany
 Time Warner Cable Buffalo
 Time Warner Cable Rochester
 Time Warner Cable Central New York / Syracuse
 Time Warner Cable New England
 Time Warner Cable New York City
 Carolinas Region
 Time Warner Cable Charlotte
 Time Warner Cable Greensboro
 Time Warner Cable Eastern Carolina
 Time Warner Cable Raleigh
 Time Warner Cable South Carolina (Columbia)
 Time Warner Cable Fayetteville/Sandhills

Former divisions
Sold to Comcast
 Time Warner Cable Houma
 Time Warner Cable Houston
 Time Warner Cable Lake City/Live Oak
 Time Warner Cable Mid-South (Memphis, TN,  AR, and MS)
 Time Warner Cable Minnesota
 Time Warner Cable Shreveport
 Time Warner Cable St. Augustine/Palatka
 Time Warner Cable Cape Coral/Naples

Divisions that became Bright House Networks
 Time Warner Cable Central Florida
 Time Warner Cable Tampa Bay
 Time Warner Cable Bakersfield
 Time Warner Cable Birmingham
 Time Warner Cable Indianapolis

Rankings
The American Customer Satisfaction Index (ACSI) ranked Time Warner Cable as one of the least liked companies in terms of customer satisfaction in 2011, 2012, 2013, and 2014.

See also
List of United States telephone companies
Spectrum Sports

References

 
Charter Communications
Cable television companies of the United States
Companies based in Stamford, Connecticut
Telecommunications companies established in 1973
Mass media companies established in 1973
Mass media companies disestablished in 2016
Defunct telecommunications companies of the United States
Defunct mass media companies of the United States
1973 establishments in the United States
2016 disestablishments in the United States
Companies formerly listed on the New York Stock Exchange
Former Time Warner subsidiaries
VoIP companies of the United States
2016 mergers and acquisitions
Corporate spin-offs